Hoven may refer to:

Places
Hoven, Denmark
Hoven, South Dakota
 , a part of the town Zülpich, Kreis Euskirchen, Nordrhein-Westfalen

People
Waldemar Hoven (1903–1948), German Nazi physician executed for war crimes